Nancy Galbraith (Born 1951 in Pittsburgh, Pennsylvania) is an American postmodern/postminimalist composer. She is the Professor of composition at Carnegie Mellon University

Biography
Galbraith began playing piano at the age of four. She studied music at Ohio University (BM, 1972), West Virginia University (MM, 1978), and Carnegie Mellon University. She now (2021) teaches composition and music theory at Carnegie Mellon. She has had six works premiered with the Pittsburgh Symphony Orchestra and has a close relationship with the Mendelssohn Choir of Pittsburgh, who premiered her choral works Missa Mysteriorum and Requiem. She has had works commissioned from several Latin American ensembles. Her music is published in the United States by Subito Music, and internationally by Boosey & Hawkes.

She is the Vira Heinz Professor of Composition at Carnegie Mellon University

Compositions
Note: This list is incomplete.

Orchestral works
Morning Litany (1988)
Danza de los Duendes (1992)
Piano Concerto No. 1 (1995)
A Festive Violet Pulse (1998)
Tormenta del Sur (2001)
De Profundis ad Lucem (2002)
Fantasy for Orchestra (2003)

Vocal/choral works
In Unity and Love (1997)
Christ By Whose Death (1999)
Missa Mysteriorum (1999)
Magnificat (2002)
Four River Songs (2002)
God of Justice (2004)
Requiem (2004)
Sacred Songs and Interludes (2006)
Two Emily Dickinson Songs (2007)
Novena (2007)

Works for wind ensemble
with brightness round about it (1993)
Danza de los Duendes (1996)
Wind Symphony No. 1 (1996)
Elfin Thunderbolt (1998)
Dream Catchers (1998)
Concerto for Piano and Wind Ensemble (2000)
Internal Combustion (2001)
Washington's Landing (2006)

Chamber music
Time Cycle (1984)
Fantasia (1986)
Into Light (1989)
Aeolian Muses (1993)
Incantation and Allegro (1995)
Rhythms and Rituals (1995)
String Quartet No. 1 (1996)
Inquiet Spirits (String Quartet No. 2) (2000)
Island Echoes (2000)
Atacama Sonata (2001)
Dos Danzas Latinas (2002)
Of Nature (2003)
Sonata for Bassoon and Piano (2004)
String Quartet No. 3 (2005)
Traverso Mistico (2006)

Solo piano
Haunted Fantasy (1979)
Prelude for Piano (1986)
Piano Sonata No. 1 (1997)
Three Preludes for Piano  (2011)

Organ works
Cortege
Litany
Agnus Dei (adapted from her Mass)
Christ By Whose Death
Gloria Te Deum
Prelude and Fugue (2007)

References

External links
The official Nancy Galbraith website
Biography from Sigma Alpha Iota
Biography from Carnegie Mellon University

1951 births
20th-century classical composers
21st-century classical composers
American women classical composers
American classical composers
Living people
21st-century American composers
Musicians from Pittsburgh
Ohio University alumni
West Virginia University alumni
Carnegie Mellon University alumni
Carnegie Mellon University faculty
20th-century American women musicians
20th-century American composers
21st-century American women musicians
20th-century women composers
21st-century women composers